Jim McNally (5 July 1931 – 12 January 2018) was an American sports shooter. He competed at the 1968 Summer Olympics and the 1972 Summer Olympics.

References

1931 births
2018 deaths
American male sport shooters
Olympic shooters of the United States
Shooters at the 1968 Summer Olympics
Shooters at the 1972 Summer Olympics
Sportspeople from Duluth, Minnesota